Synolabus is a genus of leaf-rolling weevils in the family of beetles known as Attelabidae. There are at least two described species in Synolabus.

Species
These two species belong to the genus Synolabus:
 Synolabus bipustulatus (Fabricius, 1776) g b (oak leafrolling weevil)
 Synolabus nigripes (LeConte, 1824) c b
Data sources: i = ITIS, c = Catalogue of Life, g = GBIF, b = Bugguide.net

References

Further reading

External links

 

Attelabidae